Jesús Alejandro Dautt Ramírez (born 3 March 1990) is a Mexican professional footballer who plays for Santa Tecla FC of El Salvador.

He capped for Mexico at the under-17 level.

References

External links
 
 

1990 births
Living people
Mexican footballers
Association football goalkeepers
C.F. Mérida footballers
Dorados de Sinaloa footballers
Cafetaleros de Chiapas footballers
Pioneros de Cancún footballers
Ascenso MX players
Liga Premier de México players
Footballers from Sinaloa
Mexican people of Dutch descent
C.D.S. Vida players
Liga Nacional de Fútbol Profesional de Honduras players
Santa Tecla F.C. footballers
Mexican expatriate footballers
Mexican expatriate sportspeople in Honduras
Mexican expatriate sportspeople in El Salvador
Expatriate footballers in Honduras
Expatriate footballers in El Salvador
Mexico youth international footballers